Inquilinus  is a bacterial genus from the family Azospirillaceae.

References

Further reading
 

Rhodospirillales
Bacteria genera